WXYT may refer to:

 WXYT (AM), a radio station (1270 AM) licensed to Detroit, Michigan, United States
 WXYT-FM, a radio station (97.1 FM) licensed to Detroit, Michigan, United States